Vital Tomosi Dairy Limited is a dairy processing company in Uganda. The company is a joint venture between Vital Capital Fund, "an impact investing fund primarily focused on Sub-Saharan Africa", and "Tomosi Dairy Farms, a Ugandan producer of dairy products".

Location
The main office and factory of the company are located in the town of Rushere, Kiruhura District, in the Ankole sub-region of Uganda's  Western Region. The geographical coordinates of the factory and company are: 0°12'38.0"S, 30°56'24.0"E (Latitude:-0.210556; Longitude:30.940000).

Overview
The company and its factory were set up over a four-year period. As of June 2017, the factory processes 50,000 liters of milk daily, on two production lines, one for yogurt and the other for UHT milk.

The factory, which cost $13 million (about USh46.8 billion, at that time) to build, is jointly owned by Vital Capital Fund, an Israel-based private equity firm and Tomosi Dairy Farms of Uganda. The processing plant was commissioned in November 2016 and produces yoghurt and UHT milk under the "Milkman" brand.

A new production line was commissioned on 29 January 2019 by Yoweri Museveni, Uganda's president. With the new production line, capacity at the factory increased to  daily.

Tomosi's Dairy Farm was established in 1964, by the founders, Mr. and Mrs. Tomosi Rwabwogo. Production from this farm is supplemented with production from the community, to supply the factory's fresh milk requirements.

See also
 List of milk processing companies in Uganda
 Dairy industry in Uganda

References

External links
Official webpage
Milkman yoghurt producer seeks government protection As at 31 January 2019.
Opportunities and challenges in Uganda’s dairy industry

Dairy products companies of Uganda
Companies established in 2014
2014 establishments in Uganda
Food and drink companies established in 2014
Kiruhura District
Ankole sub-region
Western Region, Uganda